Fried sweet potato features in a variety of dishes and cuisines including the popular sweet potato fries, a variation of French fries using sweet potato instead of potato. Fried sweet potatoes are known as patates in Guinean cuisine, where they are more popular than potatoes and more commonly used to make fries.

Recipes for fried sweet potatoes in the United States go back to the nineteenth century. Some suggest parboiling the sweet potatoes before frying, while others call for frying them with sugar.

Goguma twigim is a fried sweet potato dish in Korean cuisine. Kananga phodi-tawa is a dish of lightly battered and fried sweet potato in Indian cuisine.

Nutrition
In comparison to french fries made using potatoes, both contain similar levels of macro-nutrients, calories, carbohydrates, fiber, and fat (before cooking). Sweet potato fries are higher in fiber, calcium, and vitamin A, while potato fries contain more iron, potassium, and vitamin C. When deep fried both will contain very similar levels of fat, but if the sweet potato "fries" have actually been baked they will have much less fat.

See also

 Cactus fries
 List of sweet potato dishes
 Sweet potato pie
 Sweet potato soup
Vegetable tempura

References

Deep fried foods
Sweet potatoes
Cuisine of the Southern United States